The Chapters Live is a live album by Canadian progressive rock band Saga that was recorded in 2003, released in 2005. It is the last live recording to feature drummer Steve Negus.

Details
The album compiles all 16 "Chapter" songs in live format in its correct order, which were originally released over eight studio albums starting in 1978 and concluding in 2003. The studio versions were released over a 25-year period in a mixed-up order to create a conceptual puzzle.

Concept
The story was inspired by the Cold War, and the preservation of Albert Einstein's brain, which was kept by Thomas S. Harvey, M.D. There are also science fiction themes, such as aliens being concerned with humanity's self-destruction, and the resurrection of the dead through technology.

Track listing

Personnel 
 Michael Sadler – lead vocals, except on "No Regrets (Chapter 5)" and "Not This Way (Chapter 10)", keyboards
 Ian Crichton – guitars
 Jim Gilmour – keyboards, clarinet (on Disc one title 5), backing and lead vocals on "No Regrets (Chapter 5)", "Not This Way (Chapter 10)" and first and last part of "Worlds Apart (Chapter 16)".
 Jim Crichton – bass, bass keyboards
 Steve Negus – drums

References 

Saga (band) albums
2005 live albums
Inside Out Music live albums